This is a list of notable British people of Albanian descent.

Notable people
Erjon Dollapi, Rugby League player
Olsi Krasniqi, Rugby League player
Zeli Ismail, Footballer
Armando Broja, Footballer
Kreshnik Qato, Boxer
Rita Ora, Musician
Eder Kurti, Boxer
Thomas Simaku, Composer
Jimmy Marku, Strongman
Dua Lipa, Musician

References

List
Albanian diaspora by country
Albania–United Kingdom relations